The Home Defence Executive (H.D.E.) was formed on 10 May 1940 under General Sir Edmund Ironside, Commander-in-chief Home Forces, to organise the defence of Britain from invasion by the Axis powers

See also
 Home Guard (United Kingdom)

Notes and references

1940 establishments in the United Kingdom
Civil defence organisations based in the United Kingdom
United Kingdom home front during World War II
Military history of the United Kingdom during World War II
Military units and formations established in 1940